The anterior nasal spine, or anterior nasal spine of maxilla, is a bony projection in the skull that serves as a cephalometric landmark. The anterior nasal spine is the projection formed by the fusion of the two maxillary bones at the intermaxillary suture. It is placed at the level of the nostrils, at the uppermost part of the philtrum. It rarely fractures.

Additional images

See also
 Posterior nasal spine

References

External links

 Diagram at upstate.edu - side
 Diagram at upstate.edu - front
  - "Osteology of the Skull: The Maxilla"
 
 

Bones of the head and neck